The 2016 Open BNP Paribas Banque de Bretagne was a professional tennis tournament played on hard courts. It was the sixth edition of the tournament which was part of the 2016 ATP Challenger Tour. It took place in Quimper, France, between 29 February and 6 March 2016.

Singles main-draw entrants

Seeds

1 Rankings as of February 22, 2016.

Other entrants
The following players received wildcards into the singles main draw:
  Grégoire Barrère
  Albano Olivetti
  Maxime Tabatruong
  Maxime Teixeira

The following players received entry from the qualifying draw:
  Romain Jouan
  Tobias Kamke
  Andrey Rublev
  Alexandre Sidorenko

The following players received entry as a lucky loser:
  Nikola Mektić

Retirements

  Calvin Hemery (right adductor injury)
  Igor Sijsling (personal reasons)

Withdrawals

Before The Tournament

  Pierre-Hugues Herbert (general fatigue)

During The Tournament

  Sergiy Stakhovsky (low back injury)

Champions

Singles

  Andrey Rublev def.  Paul-Henri Mathieu 6–7(6–8), 6–4, 6–4

Doubles

  Tristan Lamasine /  Albano Olivetti def.  Nikola Mektić /  Antonio Šančić 6–2, 4–6, [10–7]

External links
Official Website

Open BNP Paribas Banque de Bretagne
Open BNP Paribas Banque de Bretagne
Open BNP Paribas